Montesano Salentino is a town and comune in the province of Lecce in the Apulia region of south-east Italy.

Twin towns
 San Donato di Ninea, Italy
 Gallikos, Greece

References

Cities and towns in Apulia
Localities of Salento